Sophia Institute Press is a non-profit publishing company based in Nashua, New Hampshire, United States.

It publishes Catholic books, the online opinion journal Crisis Magazine, the traditionalist Catholic website OnePeterFive, the Tridentine Mass missalette Benedictus, the website CatholicExchange.com, and catechetical materials for teachers. It also operates a music division, Sophia Music Group, via its 2021 acquisition of the De Montfort Music and AimHigher Recordings labels.

Since 2012, the president of the organization has been Charlie McKinney.

History
Sophia Institute was founded in 1983 by John L. Barger, then a philosophy professor at Magdalen College in Bedford, New Hampshire, along with his student Paul DiIulio. Under Barger's direction, the press published over 200 titles and 2.5 million books. In 2011, while the press was the publishing division of Thomas More College of Liberal Arts and Holy Spirit College, Charlie McKinney was the publisher's chief operating officer.

In 2012, Barger retired from directing Sophia Institute, and the Institute's board selected Charlie McKinney as its new president.

Sophia Institute for Teachers
In 2014, Sophia Institute began Sophia Institute for Teachers to aid Catholic religion teachers, offering lesson plans, instructional videos, and teacher formation workshops. As of 2020, Sophia Institute for Teachers had partnered with nearly 50 Catholic dioceses nationwide and had trained over 20,000 teachers.

In 2017, Sophia Institute for Teachers launched a K-8 school textbook series, Spirit of Truth, later followed by faith formation programs for parishes and a high school theology textbook series.

Partnership with EWTN Global Catholic Network
In 2015, Sophia Institute Press formed a joint venture with the international Catholic television service EWTN to establish EWTN Publishing, a new entity that publishes books by the network's foundress Mother Angelica and other hosts of EWTN programming.

Crisis magazine
In 1982 at Notre Dame, theologian Michael Novak and philosophy professor Ralph McInerny founded an opinion magazine under the title Catholicism in Crisis, as a voice of Catholic neoconservative political and cultural thought. In 1986 its title was changed to Crisis. From 1995 to 2011 Deal Hudson was the magazine's publisher. In late 2007 the magazine ceased print publication, and its content moved to its companion website under the title "Inside Catholic". After Sophia Institute Press acquired the magazine in 2011, it resumed the name Crisis. The college transferred the magazine to Sophia Institute in 2012. Eric Sammons was named the Editor-in-Chief in January 2021.

Crisis Publications
In April 2019, the press began publishing books with Crisis Magazine branding. The new imprint, called Crisis Publications, is dedicated to books that examine social and cultural trends from a Roman Catholic perspective.

References

External links
 Official website
 Sophia Institute for Teachers
 Crisis magazine
 Catholic Exchange

Companies based in Hillsborough County, New Hampshire
Book publishing companies of the United States
Conservative media in the United States
Catholic publishing companies
Catholic websites
Christian publishing companies
Traditionalist Catholicism